Lee Acres is a census-designated place in San Juan County, New Mexico, United States. Its population was 5,858 as of the 2010 census. It is located on U.S. Route 64 between Farmington and Bloomfield.

Demographics

Education 
Most of Lee Acres is in Farmington Municipal Schools while a portion is in Bloomfield Schools. Bloomfield High School is the local high school of the latter.

References

Census-designated places in New Mexico
Census-designated places in San Juan County, New Mexico